The National Venturing president is the leading youth member of  Venturing, BSA and is a voting member of the Executive Board of the National Council of the Boy Scouts of America.

References

http://www.venturing.org/past-nvoa-officers.html
http://venturing.org
http://www.venturing.org/meet-your-officers.html

Boy Scouts of America
Lists of people involved in Scouting